Thamarai (born 10 November 1975) is a noted Tamil poet and lyricist. She is a prominent figure in the Tamil literary world. She made her debut in the Tamil film industry through the 1998 film Iniyavale, which was directed by Seeman and music composed by Deva.

Life and career
Thamarai was born in Coimbatore, Tamil Nadu on 10 November 1975. She graduated from Government College of Technology, Coimbatore, in production engineering and worked for six years in Coimbatore. With her passion for poetry, she decided to move to Chennai, where she worked as a freelance journalist in an organization named Bhagya and wrote essays, stories and poems. Through her literary works, she became popular and got noticed. Director Seeman assigned her as lyricist for the song "Thendral Enthan" for his Tamil film Iniyavale. Subsequently, she wrote lyrics for films such as Unnidathil Ennai Koduthen ("Malligai Poove") and Thenali ("Injirango Injirango"). Her work together with music director Harris Jayaraj in Minnale marked the turning point in her cine industry career, primarily noted for her song "Vaseegara" in the movie.

After Minnale, the trio, composed of director Gautham Vasudev Menon and music director Harris Jayaraj, teamed up several times again (Kaakha Kaakha, Vettaiyaadu Vilaiyaadu, Pachaikili Muthucharam and Vaaranam Aayiram) and were a very successful collaboration in the film field, until the break-up between Menon and Jayaraj happened. Since then, she is teaming up with A. R. Rahman, who replaced Jayaraj. Gautham Vasudev Menon, Harris Jayaraj and Thamarai trio teamed up again in July 2014 for Ajith Kumar starrer Yennai Arindhaal... The film's album was released on 1 January 2015, and it was well received by critics. She wrote" Neeraambal Poovae" from the movie Nannbenda, where she again works for Harris Jayaraj. The song is sung by Arjun Menon.

Personal life
Thamarai is married to Thozhar Thiyagu. They have a son. Thamarai is a vegan and an advocate of animal rights.

Filmography

Awards
 Filmfare Awards South
 Filmfare Award for Best Lyricist – Vaaranam Aayiram (2008)
 Filmfare Award for Best Lyricist – Vinnaithaandi Varuvaayaa (2010)
 Filmfare Award for Best Lyricist – Achcham Yenbadhu Madamaiyada (2016)

 Tamil Nadu State Film Awards
 Tamil Nadu State Film Award for Best Lyricist- Thenali (2000)
Tamil Nadu State Film Honorary Award - Paavender Bharathidasan Award in 2006

 Vijay Awards
 Vijay Award for Best Lyricist – Vaaranam Aayiram (2008)
 Vijay Award for Best Lyricist – Muppozhudhum Un Karpanaigal (2012)
 Other awards and recognition
 ITFA Best Lyricist Award – Kaaka Kaaka (2003)
 Meera Isaiaruvi Tamil Music Award for Best Lyricist – Vaaranam Aayiram (2008)
Anandha Vikatan awards - Best lyricist for Thalli pogathey
Zee Cine Awards - Best Lyricist for Kaanana Kanney - Viswasam (2020)

 Nominations
 Filmfare Award for Best Lyricist – Kaaka Kaaka (2003)
 Filmfare Award for Best Lyricist – Ghajini (2005)
 Filmfare Award for Best Lyricist – Subramaniapuram (2008)
 Filmfare Award for Best Lyricist – Pasanga (2009)
 Vijay Award for Best Lyricist – Pasanga (2009)
 Vijay Award for Best Lyricist – Vinnaithaandi Varuvaayaa (2010)
 Filmfare Award for Best Lyricist – 7aum Arivu (2011)
 Filmfare Award for Best Lyricist – Yennai Arindhaal (2015)
 SIIMA for Best Lyricist – Achcham Yenbadhu Madamaiyada (2017)
 SIIMA for Best Lyricist – Viswasam
 SIIMA for Best Lyricist – Maara

See also
 List of vegans

References

External links
 Kavignar Thamarai's short Tamil poems
 Thamarai's songs at Hummaa.com
 Thamarai – Kavi Samurai  at PixMonk.com

Living people
1975 births
21st-century Indian poets
21st-century Indian women writers
21st-century Indian writers
Filmfare Awards South winners
People from Coimbatore
Poets from Tamil Nadu
Indian lyricists
Indian veganism activists
Indian women poets
Tamil film poets
Tamil-language lyricists